Beauty shop may refer to:

In retail and services

Beauty salon - a service offering various in-store treatments related to cosmetics and beauty
Beauty store - a retail shop selling cosmetics and personal care items

In culture
Beauty Shop, a 2005 film
The Beauty Shop (film), a 1922 film
The Beauty Shop (band), an Americana rock band